Vaglia is a comune (municipality) in the Metropolitan City of Florence in the Italian region Tuscany, located about  north of Florence.

It is home to Villa Demidoff, housing the remains of the Villa Medici di Pratolino. The communal territory also includes the Sanctuary of Montesenario, one of the most important ones in Tuscany.

References

External links

 Official website

Cities and towns in Tuscany